Henry Ludlam House is located in the Dennisville section of Dennis Township in Cape May County, New Jersey, United States. The house was added to the National Register of Historic Places on August 12, 1993.

See also
National Register of Historic Places listings in Cape May County, New Jersey

References

Dennis Township, New Jersey
Federal architecture in New Jersey
Houses on the National Register of Historic Places in New Jersey
Houses in Cape May County, New Jersey
National Register of Historic Places in Cape May County, New Jersey
New Jersey Register of Historic Places